Garbel Point (‘Nos Garbel’ \'nos 'g&r-bel\) is the rocky point forming the west extremity of Liège Island in the Palmer Archipelago, Antarctica.

The point is named after Garbel Peak in central Balkan Mountains, Bulgaria..

Location
British mapping in 1980.

Maps
 British Antarctic Territory.  Scale 1:200000 topographic map.  DOS 610 Series, Sheet W 64 62.  Directorate of Overseas Surveys, UK, 1980.
 Antarctic Digital Database (ADD). Scale 1:250000 topographic map of Antarctica. Scientific Committee on Antarctic Research (SCAR). Since 1993, regularly upgraded and updated.

References
 Bulgarian Antarctic Gazetteer. Antarctic Place-names Commission. (details in Bulgarian, basic data in English)
 Garbel Point. SCAR Composite Antarctic Gazetteer.

External links
 Garbel Point. Copernix satellite image

Headlands of the Palmer Archipelago
Bulgaria and the Antarctic
Liège Island